Cannabis in the United Arab Emirates The new legislation outlined in UAE Official Gazette coming into effect on January 2 2022. In which Carrying food, drinks or any other products which contains marijuana, hashish or THC, found destroyed.

Economy
The UAE is not a significant cannabis producer or consumer, but is a major transshipment point for cannabis from Pakistan and Afghanistan, due to its free ports and heterogeneous population.

References

United Arab Emirates
Politics of the United Arab Emirates
Society of the United Arab Emirates